Kieron McQuaid (born 17 November 1950) is a former Irish cyclist. He competed in the individual road race and team time trial events at the 1972 Summer Olympics.

References

External links
 

1950 births
Living people
Irish male cyclists
Olympic cyclists of Ireland
Cyclists at the 1972 Summer Olympics
Place of birth missing (living people)